KTKO 105.7 FM is a radio station licensed to Beeville, Texas.  The station broadcasts a country music format and is owned by Beeville Investments, LLC.

References

External links

TKO
Country radio stations in the United States